FM 104 may refer to:

FM104, a station in Dublin, Ireland
Farm to Market Road 104